Kouadio-Yves Dabila (born 1 January 1997) is an Ivorian professional footballer who plays as a defender for Ligue 2 club Paris FC.

Club career

Monaco
Dabila made his professional debut on 26 April 2017 in a Coupe de France semi-final against Paris Saint-Germain, replacing Andrea Raggi in the 60th minute of a 5–0 away loss.

Lille
In summer 2017, Dabila joined Lille on his first professional contract.

On 15 July 2019, Lille loaned Dabila to Cercle Brugge in the Belgian First Division A for the 2019–20 season.

Dabila signed for Mouscron on a season-long loan in August 2020. In January 2022, he was loaned out to Belgium once again, this time to Seraing.

Paris FC
In August 2022, he signed for Ligue 2 club Paris FC until 2024 on a permanent deal.

International career
Dabila was called up to the senior Ivory Coast squad for a friendly against Togo in March 2018. He debuted for the Ivory Coast U23s in a pair of 2019 Africa U-23 Cup of Nations qualification matches in March 2019.

Career statistics

Honours 
Ivory Coast U23
Africa U-23 Cup of Nations runner-up: 2019

References

External links
 AS Monaco profile

1997 births
Living people
People from Zanzan District
Ivorian footballers
Ivory Coast under-20 international footballers
Association football defenders
AS Monaco FC players
Lille OSC players
Cercle Brugge K.S.V. players
Royal Excel Mouscron players
R.F.C. Seraing (1922) players
Paris FC players
Ligue 1 players
Ligue 2 players
Belgian Pro League players
Ivorian expatriate footballers
Expatriate footballers in Monaco
Expatriate footballers in France
Expatriate footballers in Belgium
Footballers at the 2020 Summer Olympics
Olympic footballers of Ivory Coast
Ivorian expatriate sportspeople in Monaco
Ivorian expatriate sportspeople in France
Ivorian expatriate sportspeople in Belgium